Francis, Duke of Teck,  (Francis Paul Charles Louis Alexander; 28 August 1837 – 21 January 1900) known as Count Francis von Hohenstein until 1863, was an Austrian-born nobleman who married into the British royal family. His wife, Princess Mary Adelaide of Cambridge, was a first cousin of Queen Victoria. He was the father of Queen Mary, the consort of King George V. Francis held the Austrian title of Count of Hohenstein (Graf von Hohenstein), and the German titles of Prince (Fürst) and later Duke of Teck (Herzog von Teck), and was given the style of Serene Highness in 1863. He was granted the British style of Highness in 1887.

Background and early military career
Francis was born on 28 August 1837 in Esseg, Slavonia (now Osijek, Croatia), and christened Franz Paul Karl Ludwig Alexander. His father was Duke Alexander of Württemberg, the son of Duke Louis of Württemberg. His mother was Hungarian Countess Claudine Rhédey von Kis-Rhéde. The marriage was morganatic, meaning that Francis had no succession rights to the Kingdom of Württemberg. His title at birth was Count Francis von Hohenstein, after his mother was created Countess von Hohenstein in her own right by Emperor Ferdinand I of Austria.

He was educated at the Imperial Austrian Academy of Engineers from 1849 to 1853 and joined the Imperial Austrian Army as a lieutenant in the 1st Lancers in 1854. He transferred to the Guard Squadron in 1858 and later became a Captain (Rittmeister) in the 7th Hussars. He served as Orderly Officer under Count von Wimpffen in Italy during the Austro-Sardinian War and was awarded the gold medal for distinguished service at the Battle of Solferino and the bronze war medal, 1859.

In 1863, Francis was created Prince of Teck, with the style of Serene Highness, in the Kingdom of Württemberg. He served during the Austro-Prussian War and retired from the Austrian Army when he married and moved to England in 1866.

Marriage and dukedom

As the product of a morganatic marriage, and without succession rights to the throne, Francis was not acceptable as a husband for princesses in most of the European royal houses. Further, Francis had little income in comparison with other European princes. He thus married into a richer family, by marrying his father's third cousin (in descent from George II of Great Britain) Princess Mary Adelaide of Cambridge, the younger daughter of Prince Adolphus, Duke of Cambridge, and a granddaughter of George III.

The couple married on 12 June 1866 at St Anne's Church, Kew, in Surrey. They had one daughter and three sons:

Princess Victoria Mary of Teck (1867–1953); later Queen Mary, consort of King George V of the United Kingdom.
Prince Adolphus of Teck (1868–1927); later Duke of Teck and Marquess of Cambridge.
Prince Francis of Teck (1870–1910).
Prince Alexander of Teck (1874–1957); later Earl of Athlone.

He was created Duke of Teck by the King of Württemberg in 1871.

Later military career
Teck was made Honorary Colonel of the 1st Surrey Artillery Volunteers on 15 June 1867 and continued as supernumerary Honorary Colonel of the 1st City of London Artillery after the units merged in 1883. He was also made Honorary Colonel of the 49th Middlesex Rifle Volunteers (Post Office Rifles) on 16 August 1876.

He was attached to the staff of British General Sir Garnet Wolseley during the Egyptian campaign of 1882. He received the silver medal for the Battle of Tel-el-Kebir, the Khedive's Star, and the Order of Osmanieh, first class. On his return from Egypt he was gazetted a Colonel in the British Army.

The Duke of Teck was made Colonel (Oberst) à la suite of the 25th (1st Württemberg) Dragoons "Queen Olga" on 6 March 1889, and a Generalmajor in the German Army on 18 October 1891. He was made a supernumerary Major-General in the British Army in July 1893 and a Generalleutnant in the German Army on 18 April 1895.

Because Francis had no inheritance, the couple lived on Mary Adelaide's Parliamentary allowance of £5,000 per annum (equivalent to ca. £525,000 in 2013), supplemented by income from her mother, the Duchess of Cambridge. Mary Adelaide's requests to her cousin, Queen Victoria, for more funds were met with refusal; however, they were granted a grace-and-favour apartment in Kensington Palace, London and a country house, White Lodge, the former Royal deer-hunting lodge in Richmond Park, Southwest London.

The Duke and Duchess lived beyond their means, leading to the build-up of large debts. In 1883, the Tecks fled the UK to continental Europe, where they stayed with relatives in Florence and Germany. They eventually returned to the UK in 1885.

Later life
With an Order in Council on 1 July 1887, Queen Victoria granted Francis the style of Highness, as a gift to celebrate her Golden Jubilee. Despite this, the Tecks were still seen as minor relatives, with little status or wealth. Their fortunes improved when their only daughter, Princess Victoria Mary of Teck (known as May to her family) became engaged to the second-in-line to the British throne, Prince Albert Victor, Duke of Clarence and Avondale. There was initial opposition to the match from the Duke of Clarence's parents, the Prince and Princess of Wales: Arthur Balfour wrote to Lord Salisbury in 1890 that "(t)he Teck girl they won't have because they hate Teck and because the vision of Princess Mary haunting Marlborough House makes the Prince of Wales ill." Nevertheless, the Queen gave her official consent to the engagement on 12 December 1891. The death of the Duke of Clarence only six weeks later was a cruel blow. However, Princess May consented when the Duke of Clarence's brother (and next in the line of succession), Prince George, Duke of York, proposed to her instead.

In 1897, the Duchess of Teck died, leaving Francis a widower. He continued to live at White Lodge, Richmond, but did not carry out any royal duties.

In Who's Who, the Duke of Teck listed his recreations as "a little of all". He was President of the Royal Botanic Society and a member of numerous clubs, including White's, the Marlborough Club, the Bachelors' Club, the Army and Navy Club, the United Service Club, the Cavalry Club, the Naval and Military Club, the Travellers Club, The Hurlingham Club, the Ranelagh Club, and the Jockey Club, as well as the Adels-Casino in Vienna and the Herren-Casino in Stuttgart.

The Duke of Teck died on 21 January 1900 at White Lodge. He was buried next to his wife in the Royal Vault at St George's Chapel, Windsor Castle.

There is a pub in Earls Court, London, called the Prince of Teck.

Titles, styles, honours and arms

Titles and styles
28 August 1837 – 1 December 1863: Count Francis von Hohenstein
1 December 1863 – 16 September 1871: His Serene Highness Prince Francis of Teck
16 September 1871 – 11 July 1887: His Serene Highness The Duke of Teck
11 July 1887 – 21 January 1900: His Highness The Duke of Teck

Honours
 :
 Grand Cross of the Order of the Württemberg Crown
 Grand Cross of the Friedrich Order
 :
 GCB: Honorary Knight Grand Cross of the Most Honourable Order of the Bath (civil division), 12 June 1866
 Egypt Medal, 1882
 Khedive's Star, 1882
 GCVO: Knight Grand Cross of the Royal Victorian Order, 30 June 1897
 KStJ: Knight of Justice of the Venerable Order of Saint John of Jerusalem
  Mecklenburg: Grand Cross of the House Order of the Wendish Crown, with Crown in Ore, 11 June 1866
   Austria-Hungary: Grand Cross of the Imperial Order of Leopold, 1869
 : Grand Cross of the Grand Ducal Hessian Order of Ludwig, 9 July 1881
 : Order of Osmanieh, 1st Class, 1882
  Kingdom of Prussia: Grand Cross of the Order of the Red Eagle, 28 July 1891

Ancestry

References

1837 births
1900 deaths
People from Osijek
Francis
Francis
Dukes of Teck
People of the Austro-Prussian War
British Army generals
British Army personnel of the Anglo-Egyptian War
Knights Grand Cross of the Order of the Bath
Knights of Justice of the Order of St John
Knights Grand Cross of the Royal Victorian Order
Burials at St George's Chapel, Windsor Castle
Residents of White Lodge, Richmond Park